Cutmore is a surname. Notable people with the surname include:

 Geoff Cutmore (born 1966), English financial journalist for CNBC Europe
 Jack Cutmore-Scott (born 1985), British actor
 Jim Cutmore (1898−1985), English first-class cricketer
 John "Snowy" Cutmore, Australian criminal